Formless is the second album from progressive metal band Aghora, released in December 2006. This is their first album with vocalist Diana Serra.

Track listing
 Lotus – 1:14
 Atmas Heave – 5:10
 Moksha – 5:29
 Open Close the Book – 4:58
 Garuda – 2:53
 Dual Alchemy – 5:36
 Dime – 7:00
 1316 – 5:30
 Fade – 4:40
 Skinned – 6:41
 Mahayana – 7:16
 Formless – 12:31
 Purification – 1:45

Credits

Aghora
Diana Serra — vocals
Santiago Dobles — lead guitar, Banjo, fretless guitar, programming
Alan Goldstein — bass guitar
Giann Adryen — drums, tabla, percussion
Sean Reinert — drums

Additional personnel
Alan Douches — Mastering
Eliran Kantor — Artwork and design
Santiago Dobles — Producer/Engineer
Neil Kernon — Producer/Mixer
Travis Huff — Drums Tracking
Daniel Escauriza — Additional Engineering and Tracking
Jeff Lewis — Assistant Engineering
Colton Pasker — Assistant Engineering
Nick Bati Grubisich — Assistant Engineering

References

External links
 Formless Album Review

2006 albums
Aghora (band) albums
Albums produced by Neil Kernon
Albums with cover art by Eliran Kantor